Haymakers' Grounds was a baseball grounds in Troy, New York. It was home to the Troy Haymakers of the National Association from 1871 to 1872 and home to the Troy Trojans of the National League from 1880 to 1881.

The NL club played home games at Putnam Grounds, Troy, in 1879, and at Troy Ball Club Grounds, Watervliet, in 1882.

References 
Haymakers' Grounds in Troy
Retrosheet. "Park Directory". Retrieved 2006-09-04.

Defunct baseball venues in the United States
Sports venues in Rensselaer County, New York
Baseball venues in New York (state)
Defunct sports venues in New York (state)
Buildings and structures in Troy, New York